Mathoris is a genus of moths of the family Thyrididae.

Species
Some species of this genus are:
Mathoris crepuscula  Guenee 1877
Mathoris loceusalis  (Walker 1859)
Mathoris magica  Gaede 1917
Mathoris thyralis  (Walker 1866)

References

Thyrididae
Moth genera